Countdown to Doomsday may refer to:

 Buck Rogers: Countdown to Doomsday, a computer game
 Countdown to Doomsday (film), a 1966 spy film